Calçot is a type of green onion. The name calçot comes from the Catalan language. The calçot from Valls (Tarragona, Catalonia, Spain) is a registered EU Protected Geographical Indication.

Calçots are milder and less bulbous than onions and have a length of between 15 and 25 cm (white part) and a diameter of 1.7 to 2.5 cm at the root. Planted in trenches, like an onion, as a single bulb, and successively increasing the depth of the soil around the stems throughout autumn and winter (see earthing up), they sprout into 4–10 shoots, roughly the shape of small leeks or scallions.

The origin of the calçot and its cooking method is in the town of Valls, Catalonia, Spain, where an annual event celebrates the harvest of calçots. Nowadays, thousands of eating gatherings centered around the calçots, called calçotades (singular: calçotada), are celebrated around Catalonia. In these events, they are grilled over a hot fire, wrapped up in newspaper, served on terra cotta tiles and eaten, after peeling with bare hands, by dipping them one by one in salvitxada sauce (sauce made with almonds).

Etymology 
The origin of the word calçot comes from term "calçar" in Catalan, which corresponds to hilling. Hence  the word "calçot" roughly mean "that which has been hilled". This is due to the fact that calçots get their characteristic shape and texture from this process.

The word "calçar" itself literally means "to shoe", and ultimately derives from the Latin calceus, a type of footwear that covered the ankle and lower shin - hence its use by analogy in this context.

Origin
The origin of the variety is disputed, but one of the most commonly accepted versions [unsubstantiated] of its history is that they were developed by Xat de Benaiges, a peasant farmer from Valls around the turn of the 20th century. He is said to have been the first to have planted the sprouts of garden onions, covering them with earth so a longer portion of the stems remained white and edible.

Calçotada
The most traditional way of eating calçots is at a calçotada (plural: calçotades), a gastronomical celebration held between November and April, where barbecued calçots are consumed in massive quantities.

In a typical event, calçots are grilled until the outer layers are charred, then wrapped in newspaper to steam, served on terra cotta tiles and eaten after peeling off the charred skin with bare hands and dipping the white portion in salvitxada (not to be confused with romesco sauce, a sauce intended for fish). The green tops are discarded. It's customary to wear a large bib for the sauce stains. The calçots can be accompanied by red wine or cava sparkling wine. Pieces of meat and bread slices are often roasted in the charcoal after cooking the calçots. For dessert, a typical choice is oranges and white cava.

Gallery

See also

Traditions of Catalonia
Ramps, another species of Allium around which festivals are held

References

Further reading

Various authors (1999) El calçot i el seu entorn: Actes del I Congrés de la Cuina del Calçot (El Cullerot) (Catalan) 

Onions
Allium